を, in hiragana, or ヲ in katakana, is one of the Japanese kana, each of which represents one mora. The combination of a W-column kana letter with を゙ in hiragana was introduced to represent [vo] in the 19th century and 20th century.

Modern usage
In Japanese, this kana is used almost exclusively for a particle for both forms; therefore, the katakana form (ヲ) is rare in everyday language mostly seen in all-katakana text. A "wo" sound is usually represented as うぉ or ウォ instead.

Despite originally representing , the syllable is pronounced  by almost all modern speakers. Singers may pronounce it with the [w], as may those attempting to emphasize the syllable for clarity. Apart from some literate speakers who have revived [wo] as a spelling pronunciation, though, this  sound is extinct in the modern spoken language.

Katakana ヲ can sometimes be combined with a dakuten, ヺ, to represent a  sound in foreign words; however, most IMEs lack a convenient way to do this. The combination ヴォ is used far more frequently to represent the /vo/ sound.

Stroke order

Other communicative representations

 Full Braille representation

 Computer encodings

References

Specific kana